The 1958 Penn Quakers football team was an American football team that represented the University of Pennsylvania as a member of the Ivy League during the 1958 NCAA University Division football season. 

In their fifth year under head coach Steve Sebo, the Quakers compiled a 4–5 record and were outscored 177 to 153. Ray Kelly was the team captain.

Penn's 4–3 conference record tied for fourth place in the Ivy League. The Quakers outscored their Ivy opponents 145 to 84.

Penn played its home games at Franklin Field adjacent to the university's campus in Philadelphia, Pennsylvania.

Schedule

References

Penn
Penn Quakers football seasons
Penn Quakers football